Joy Sarney (born Florence Joy Crabtree, 1944) is an English female pop singer, best known for a UK hit single, "Naughty Naughty Naughty" in 1977.

Career
Sarney was born in Liverpool and started out as a folk/comedy performer in the Liverpool trio, The Crabtrees, in the mid-1960s, with her brother Hal and Derek Marsden. The Crabtrees performed in venues all over Merseyside, and their act embraced traditional, contemporary and humorous songs. She sang with the Mickey Jupp Band.

The song "Naughty Naughty Naughty", was a novelty love song between the singer and Mr Punch, and reached Number 26 on the UK Singles Chart in May 1977. A follow-up single, "Angling for a Kiss", was released in November 1977, but failed to make the chart, and Sarney remains a one-hit wonder.

"Naughty Naughty Naughty" was engineered by Chris Tsangarides at Morgan Studios in Willesden, North London. The single was issued by Alaska Records, owned by the record producer and musician, John Schroeder.

References

1944 births
Living people
People from Southend-on-Sea
Musicians from Liverpool
Sarney, Joy